Chester Bradley Jordan (October 15, 1839 – August 24, 1914)  was an American teacher, lawyer, and Republican politician from Lancaster, New Hampshire.

Early life

Jordan was born October 15, 1839 in Colebrook, New Hampshire to Johnson and Minerva (Buel) Jordan,

Coos Republican newspaper
In 1897 Jordan became the owner of the Coos Republican.

New Hampshire legislative service
Jordan served in both houses of the New Hampshire legislature and had the dual honor of heading both. He was Speaker of the House in 1881 and President of the Senate in 1896–1898.

Governor of New Hampshire
He served as the 48th governor of New Hampshire from 1901 to 1903.

Death and burial
Jordan died in 1914 in Lancaster, New Hampshire where he is buried in Summer Street Cemetery.

References

1839 births
1914 deaths
Republican Party governors of New Hampshire
Republican Party members of the New Hampshire House of Representatives
Republican Party New Hampshire state senators
American newspaper publishers (people)
Presidents of the New Hampshire Senate
19th-century American politicians
People from Colebrook, New Hampshire
19th-century American businesspeople